Cindy Curley (born November 12, 1963) is an ice hockey coach, executive and former player. Curley played internationally for the United States women's national ice hockey team from 1987 to 1996. Curley played for Providence College and was selected for the US team for the inaugural 1990 IIHF Women's World Championship. She was inducted into the United States Hockey Hall of Fame in 2013.

Early life
Curley is the daughter of Eugene F. "Geno" Curley and Elinor R. (Case) Curley. Curley's father played college ice hockey and her brothers also played ice hockey and Cindy learned to play as well. She chose Bobby Clarke as her hockey idol. Her father would be her coach at Assabet Valley girls' hockey.

Playing career
Curley played in college for the Providence College Friars from 1981 to 1985. She scored 110 goals, 115 points for a total of 225 points. She led her team in goals and points in 1984–85, her senior season. After college, she played for Assabet Valley women's team, which played in US tournaments.

In 1987, Curley tried out and was selected for the US women's hockey national team. Curley played on the US team in the unofficial championship of 1987. Curley played in the inaugural official 1990 IIHF Women's World Championship in Ottawa, Ontario, Canada. In five games, she scored 11 goals and 12 assists for 23 points to lead the tournament in scoring. Curley returned for the 1992 and 1994 championships. Curley was captain of the US national women's team from 1989 to 1996. Curley had several knee surgeries and retired from active play in 1994. Curley took up coaching of an under-19 girls' team and joined the board of USA Hockey and later the US Hockey Olympic Advisory Committee.

Awards
 Massachusetts Hockey Hall of Fame (2002)
 Providence College Hockey Hall of Fame (2013)
 U.S. Hockey Hall of Fame
 All-Star – 1990 IIHF World Women's Championship

References

American women's ice hockey players
1963 births
Living people
Providence Friars women's ice hockey players
United States Hockey Hall of Fame inductees